Oscar Alfredo Ustari (born 3 July 1986) is an Argentine professional footballer who plays as a goalkeeper for Liga MX club Pachuca.

After starting out at Independiente he spent most of his professional career in Spain, mainly with Getafe where he had his spell marred by injuries. He also played several seasons in Liga MX.

Ustari represented Argentina at the 2006 World Cup, and won a gold medal with the country at the Summer Olympics in 2008.

Club career
Born in América, Buenos Aires, Ustari arrived in Club Atlético Independiente's youth system at the age of 14. The untimely deaths of Emiliano Molina and Lucas Molina – both playing in his position – propelled him to the first team sooner than expected, and he made his Primera División debut on 5 October 2005 in a 2–0 win against Newell's Old Boys, remaining first choice with the Avellaneda side in the following tournaments, under both Jorge Burruchaga and Miguel Ángel Santoro (both former players with the club, the latter also a goalkeeper).

On 10 June 2007, Ustari scored from a penalty kick against Quilmes Atlético Club, also leaving the pitch injured and going on to miss the year's Copa América. One month later, he signed for Getafe CF in Spain for €4 million, teaming up with his compatriot and goalkeeper Roberto Abbondanzieri. His official debut came on 26 September 2007, in a 2–1 La Liga loss at Valencia CF.

Ustari struggled during his spell with the Madrid club, due to inconsistent performances and several injury problems. On 17 July 2012, after a 14-month lay-off due to the latter, he terminated his contract which still had another year running.

On 25 July 2012, Ustari returned to his country and joined Boca Juniors. He moved back to Spain the following year, however, with UD Almería which had just returned to the top flight.

On 21 January 2014, after only three Copa del Rey matches to his credit, Ustari was released by the Andalusians and signed a six-month contract with Sunderland. He made his debut for his new team four days later, keeping a clean sheet in a 1–0 home win against Kidderminster Harriers in the fourth round of the FA Cup. He was also in goal in the following game in the tournament, and the result was the same against Southampton, and was an unused substitute on 2 March in the final loss to Manchester City at Wembley Stadium.

On 6 July 2014, Ustari returned to his homeland again to play for Newell's Old Boys, agreeing to a one-and-a-half year deal. On 16 December of the following year, he switched to the Mexican Liga MX after signing for Club Atlas. On 2 November 2017, in the dying minutes of the 1–1 home draw to Tigres UANL while at the service of the latter club, he suffered an horrific injury to his left knee after kicking a long ball forward, going on to be sidelined for several months.

Ustari took his game to the Uruguayan Primera División in July 2019, with the free agent signing with Liverpool F.C. (Montevideo).

International career
Ustari played all the matches for the Argentina under-20 team that won the 2005 FIFA World Youth Championship. On 15 May 2006, he was named by senior side coach José Pekerman to the 2006 FIFA World Cup squad alongside his future Getafe teammate Abbondanzieri, being an unused member.

Ustari won his first full cap on 22 August 2007, featuring the entire 2–1 friendly loss in Norway. He also started the victorious campaign of the under-23 team at the 2008 Summer Olympics in Beijing, but suffered a severe foot injury in the quarter-finals against the Netherlands, being sidelined for eight months.

Personal life
Ustari's father-in-law, Ricardo Giusti, was also a footballer. He too represented Newell's and Argentina.

Honours
Boca Juniors
Copa Argentina: 2011–12

Getafe
Copa del Rey runner-up: 2007–08

Sunderland
Football League Cup runner-up: 2013–14

Pachuca
Liga MX: Apertura 2022

Argentina Youth
FIFA U-20 World Cup: 2005
Summer Olympic Games: 2008

Individual
Liga MX All-Star: 2022

References

External links

1986 births
Living people
Argentine people of Basque descent
Sportspeople from Buenos Aires Province
Argentine footballers
Association football goalkeepers
Argentine Primera División players
Club Atlético Independiente footballers
Boca Juniors footballers
Newell's Old Boys footballers
La Liga players
Getafe CF footballers
UD Almería players
Sunderland A.F.C. players
Liga MX players
Atlas F.C. footballers
C.F. Pachuca players
Uruguayan Primera División players
Liverpool F.C. (Montevideo) players
Argentina youth international footballers
Argentina under-20 international footballers
Argentina international footballers
2006 FIFA World Cup players
Footballers at the 2008 Summer Olympics
Olympic footballers of Argentina
Olympic medalists in football
Medalists at the 2008 Summer Olympics
Olympic gold medalists for Argentina
Argentine expatriate footballers
Expatriate footballers in Spain
Expatriate footballers in England
Expatriate footballers in Mexico
Expatriate footballers in Uruguay
Argentine expatriate sportspeople in Spain
Argentine expatriate sportspeople in England
Argentine expatriate sportspeople in Mexico
Argentine expatriate sportspeople in Uruguay